Robert Colin Wilson  (born 18 February 1928), known as Bob Wilson, is a former cricketer who played for Kent County Cricket Club from 1952 to 1967. Born in Bapchild in Kent in 1928, he appeared in 365 first-class cricket matches for the county as well as in five List A cricket matches towards the end of his career. He was awarded his county cap in 1954.

Wilson was a very straight batsman who was never afraid to attack. He scored 1,000 runs in a season in thirteen consecutive years, with a best of 2,038 at an average of 46.31 in 1964. His 19,458 runs for Kent in first-class cricket is the eighth in Kent's all-time list.

References

External links

1928 births
Living people
Kent cricketers
International Cavaliers cricketers
English cricketers
Marylebone Cricket Club cricketers
A. E. R. Gilligan's XI cricketers
People from the Borough of Swale